Carabus maeander is a species of beetle in the family Carabidae. It is found in northeastern United States and both central and southern Canada (including Alberta). The species is also found outside of North America. In Russia, it is found in eastern Siberia while in Japan it is known from Hokkaido and Kunashir Islands. It also exists in South Korea.

Subspecies
These six subspecies belong to the species Carabus maeander:
Carabus maeander chejuensis Deuve, 1991
Carabus maeander evenkiensis
Carabus maeander lapilayi Castelnau, 1835
Carabus maeander maeander Fischer von Waldheim, 1820
Carabus maeander nobukii (Imura, 2003)
Carabus maeander paludis Géhin, 1885

References

Further reading

External links
 

maeander
Beetles described in 1820
Taxa named by Gotthelf Fischer von Waldheim